Pimentel, Pramantellu in Sardinian language, is a comune (municipality) in the Province of South Sardinia in the Italian region Sardinia, located about  north of Cagliari.

Pimentel borders the following municipalities: Barrali, Guasila, Ortacesus, Samatzai.

Demographic evolution

References

Cities and towns in Sardinia